Miha Mazzini (born 3 June 1961 in Jesenice, Yugoslavia) is a Slovenian writer, screenwriter and film director with thirty published books, translated in ten languages. He has a PhD in anthropology from the Institutum Studiorum Humanitatis and has MA in Creative Writing for Film and Television at The University of Sheffield. He is a Voting member of the European Film Academy.

Biography
He described his childhood living with his mother and grandmother in Titoist Yugoslavia, in two novels. The protagonist of the 2002 novel King of the Rattling Spirits (based on his 2001 Sweet Dreams film script) is 12 years old and in the 2015 novel Childhood the protagonist is five.

His first novel Crumbs (American title The Cartier Project) was set in his hometown of Jesenice and published in 1989 and sold 54,000 copies. It won the government award for the best novel of the year and Mazzini won the award for excellent artistic achievement by a young writer, given by the opposition. That was highly unusual for the times when Yugoslavia started slowly breaking apart.

He was the first Slovenian writer to write a novel about the erased, people that lost all of their rights and legal status after the declaration of the country's independence in 1991. Later he adapted the novel for the feature film Erased.

His historical novel Paloma Negra was dealing with Yu-Mex music in 1950's, when Yugoslav singers started mimicking the songs and music they've seen in Mexican films. During the research for the novel, Mazzini recorded the stories told by protagonists and made a documentary called Yugoslav Mexico (YuMex). The novel German Lottery is set in the same era but deals with swindlers, illusions and unreliable protagonists.

Work

Genre
Mazzini introduced in the post-1990 Slovene literature a tough protagonist, characteristic of Noir fiction, in his novel Guarding Hanna.

Awards
His Cartier Project was the all-time best-selling novel in Yugoslavia. It won the 1987 Best Novel of the Year award from both the pro-government and opposition newspapers.

Later his work was selected for many international anthologies, recently his short story Mother was included in Contemporary European Fiction anthology and short story Avro Lancaster in Best European Fiction 2018 anthology.

In 2012, one of his stories (That Winter) received the Pushcart Prize.

Mazzini won the 2016 Kresnik Award for his novel Otroštvo (Childhood).

in 2019 he won best screenplay for the film Erased at FEST festival, Belgrade, Serbia, and at the Raindance festival, London, UK.

Reviews
"In ... Guarding Hanna, [Mazzini] has created a bestial protagonist ... a gargoyle of a man [who] struggles heroically with his own nature only to find that life has played him one horrific joke."
—Village Voice

"[Hanna's] a wonderful creation: vulnerable, lonely, trying to keep her mood upbeat but not always succeeding. In fact, she’s just the thing to melt the Beast’s hostility—or drive him, with her chatter, to homicidal distraction....Throw in the narrator’s grim musings on his lot in life and his occasional urge to strangle Hanna, and you have a tonic mix of menace and comedy that keeps things hopping right up to the book’s twist ending."
—Seattle Times

Commentary
In October 2019, Mazzini commented on the decision of Swedish Academy to give the Nobel Prize for literature to Peter Handke by saying, "some artists sold their human souls for ideologies (Hamsun and Nazism), some for hate (Celine and his rabid antisemitism), some for money and power (Kusturica) but the one that offended me the most was Handke with his naivety for the Milošević regime (...) I found him cruel and totally self-absorbed in his naivety."

Fiction books in English
 Guarding Hanna (2003, a novel)
 The Cartier Project (2004, a novel)
 King of the Rattling Spirits (2005, a novel)
 Collector of Names (2009, a novel)
 German Lottery (2012, a novel)
 Crumbs (2014, a novel)
 Paloma Negra (2014, a novel)

E-books
Mother (short story online)

Films
 Cartier Project (1991, TV film, scriptwriter)
 You're Free. Decide. (1999, short film, scriptwriter and director)
 Sweet Dreams (2001, feature film, scriptwriter)
 The Orphan with the magic voice (2003, short film, scriptwriter and director)
 A Very Simple Story (2008, short film, scriptwriter and director)
 Erased (2018, feature film, scriptwriter and director)

Multilingual Web film project
A Very Simple Story script in multiple languages, read by actresses from different countries. Screenwriter and director of Slovenian (8:28) and Italian (9:57) film. Project was nominated for the Prix Europe award.

References

External links

 Mazzini's home page
 A Very Simple Story Multilingual Web film project

Slovenian screenwriters
Male screenwriters
People from Jesenice, Jesenice
Slovenian novelists
1961 births
Living people
University of Ljubljana alumni
Kresnik Award laureates